Halifax Cobequid was a provincial electoral district in Nova Scotia, Canada, that elected one member of the Nova Scotia House of Assembly. It was formed in 1956 as Halifax Northwest from part of the former district of Halifax West. In 1966, the district was renamed Halifax County North West, and the following year, in 1967 it was renamed Halifax Cobequid.  It existed until 1978, when it was redistributed into four new districts: Sackville, Halifax Bedford Basin, Bedford-Musquodoboit Valley, and Cole Harbour.

Members of the Legislative Assembly
The electoral district was represented by the following Members of the Legislative Assembly:

Election results

1956 general election

1960 general election

1963 general election

1967 general election

1970 general election

1974 general election

References

Former provincial electoral districts of Nova Scotia